Yun Byung-se (born 3 August 1953 in Seoul) was the Foreign Affairs Minister of South Korea. His term ended 31 May 2017. From 2006 to 2008, Yun served as senior presidential secretary for foreign, security and unification policy.

See also
List of foreign ministers in 2017

References

External links

 Biography at the ministry's website, with links to press releases and press briefings

1953 births
Foreign ministers of South Korea
Government ministers of South Korea
Living people
People from Seoul
South Korean diplomats
Honorary Knights Commander of the Order of St Michael and St George
Seoul National University School of Law alumni
Paul H. Nitze School of Advanced International Studies alumni